DWF is a global legal business, headquartered in Manchester, England, with 31 offices across the world. In March 2019, DWF was listed on the London Stock Exchange. With a £366m valuation and offer size of £95m, DWF became the UK's largest listed law firm.

The firm started as a four office practice in North West England and has now grown globally through a series of international mergers. It currently has around 3,100 staff and is the 19th-largest law firm in the UK measured by revenues. It advises national and multinational corporations, financial institutions and governments.

DWF's London offices at 20 Fenchurch Street also known as London's "Walkie Talkie"

In March 2019, DWF floated on the London Stock Exchange, valued at just under £370m, rather short of the £1 billion that it was hoping for a year earlier.

History
Davies Wallis was founded in 1977 in Liverpool and merged with Dodds Ashcroft in 1989.

A merger with Foysters in 1990 brought a Manchester office and a change of name to Davies Wallis Foyster, which was abbreviated to DWF in 2007, shortly after the acquisition of Ricksons. The Ricksons acquisition added offices in Preston and Leeds. DWF opened a London office in 2008.

A series of acquisitions in 2012 and 2013 added offices in Birmingham (Buller Jeffries), Newcastle (Crutes), Glasgow and Edinburgh (both Biggart Baillie), Bristol, Dublin and a second London office (Fishburns), before acquiring Cobbetts through a pre-pack administration.

In 2014, DWF reported a 23% increase in net profit from £20.8 million in 2012/13 to £25.5 million in its first full year financial results following four mergers.

DWF opened an office in Dubai in March 2015, the firm's first office outside of the British Isles.

DWF opened six offices in 2017, including two new operations in Continental Europe. The firm opened in Berlin after hiring two lawyers from DLA Piper. It also launched its first office in France through a merger with four-partner Paris firm Heenan Blaikie. In the Asia Pacific region, DWF also launched two offices in Melbourne and Brisbane through a combination with independent firm MVM Legal.

DWF further opened in Singapore after hiring from Eversheds Sutherland’s practice. It gained bases in Sydney, Chicago and Toronto after the acquisition of claims company Triton in January.

DWF posted strong results for H1 2017/18, with revenue up 23% and net profit increasing by circa 33%. Turnover for H1 2017/18 was £113.5m in a period marked by a spate of office openings in Europe, North America and Asia Pacific.

In June 2018, DWF announced its intention to seek a stock exchange listing.

The firm strengthened the IPO business case with a double-digit growth in September 2018. DWF posted revenue growth of 18% from £201.3m to £236m ($309m) for 2017/18 ahead of the firm's initial public offering. The firm also said profit per equity partner (PEP) increased by 9%.

In September 2018, DWF agreed to an exclusive association with US law firm Wood, Smith, Henning & Berman LLP (WSHB), a Los Angeles headquartered full-service law firm with 22 offices across the US, 56 partners and 250 lawyers, and generated gross revenue of $81m in its last financial year.

In January 2020, DWF acquired Mindcrest, a legal and managed services business, for $18.50 million.

Recognition
 Legal business DWF was highly commended in the Financial Times Innovative Lawyers report and ranked 11th as most innovative law firm in Europe for developing a platform based on Kim, the AI technology that underpins Ernst & Young Riverview Law's virtual assistants, to manage employment tribunals for clients.
 In a 2018 report by Experian, DWF ranked 7th among the most active legal and financial advisers in the UK and 15th in Europe by deal volume and value.
 Nine legal experts from DWF have been recognised in The Legal 500 Hall of Fame, an annual industry benchmarking guide that recognises * DWF achieved a number of awards in 2018 in the insurance industry recognition for Insurance Law Firm of the Year at the Post Claims Awards, Best Fraud Prevention Solution of the Year and Legal Partner of the Year at the Insurance Times Claims Excellence Awards and Outsourced Partner of the Year at the British Insurance Awards.
 The business won Litigation Team of the Year at the Manchester Legal Awards and achieved Gold in the Employers Network for Equality and Inclusion (ENEI) new Talent Inclusion & Diversity Evaluation (TIDE) Awards for its outstanding equality, diversity and inclusion practices.
 DWF has been ranked 10th in the 2017 Financial Times Most Innovative Lawyers in Europe Report, and scored highest of all firms for innovation in the business of law.
 The firm won 'Best Work Placement Scheme' (Best in Law Awards 2017).
 Commended for Team of the Year – Corporate/Commercial (Manchester Legal Awards 2017).
 Won the award for ‘Data Analytics Excellence’ (Insurance Times Tech & Innovation Awards 2016).
 Won ‘Best Leadership of Innovation’ and ‘Best Managed Workplace’ (Managing Partners’ Forum Awards for Management Excellence 2015).

Notable cases
 DWF, working alongside Jones Lang LaSalle, has advised Korea's National Pension Service as lead bidder to buy Goldman Sachs’s new London headquarters for $1.56bn. The deal will see Goldman Sachs commit to a 25-year lease of the 826,000 square foot site and are set to move into the building in summer 2019. The landmark transaction is the single largest UK real estate deal this year, and the second-largest ever, after the sale of the 'Walkie Talkie' building for $1.6bn, where DWF London lawyers reside.
 DWF is advising the Royal Borough of Kensington & Chelsea as the inquiry into Grenfell Tower fire disaster in June 2017, which resulted in the deaths of at least 80 people in North Kensington.
 DWF's Police and Prison Law team have secured a favourable judgment for South Yorkshire Police in a claim brought by Sir Cliff Richard against the BBC and SYP for infringement of his privacy rights.
 The firm advised Poundland owner Pepkor on its $233m financing with US investment firm Davidson Kempner Capital Management.
 DWF advised Discovery Park, one of Europe's leading science and technology parks, on $207m biomass renewable energy plant. Around 650 Pfizer UK employees are based at Discovery Park.

Notable people and alumni
 In 2017, Sir Nigel Knowles, former High Sheriff of Greater London and Global Co-chairman and Senior Partner of DLA Piper was appointed as Chairman of DWF before being appointed as CEO. He is also Chairman of BioSURE a company which manufactures COVID-19 lateral flow tests and was chairman of recruitment firm Brewster Partners before resigning following allegations made in a report by The Times newspaper and the BBC.     
In 2018, DWF has appointed business transformation and managed services specialist Anup Kollanethu as CEO of Managed Services, who joins from Freshfields Bruckhaus Deringer after spearheading one of the UK's largest legal services offerings for the magic circle firm.
 DWF hired former DLA Piper CIO Daniel Pollick. Pollick held the role of CIO at DLA – the UK's top law firm by revenue in 2017 – from December 1997 to February 2018, and is one of the best known names in the industry.

Practice areas
DWF is structured into two legal service areas, covering Commercial Services and Insurance Services respectively. The Insurance Services area includes a practice dealing with "Claimant Services", delivered as Resolution Law. DWF also offer a wide range of additional products and services under their Connected Services division that allow clients to consolidate their supply chain. These products and services include a digital claims platform and software, as well as specialist lawyers and barristers, forensic accountants and investigators

 Capital markets
 Commercial contracts
 Commodities
 Competition
 Construction
 Corporate
 Dispute resolution
 ETI (Energy, Transport and Infrastructure)
 Government law
 Health and Safety Law
 Employment
 Finance
 Intellectual property
 Investment funds
 Legal costs
 Planning
 Private equity
 Project finance
 Public Sector  
 Real estate
 Restructuring, insolvency  special situations
 Subsidy Control  and
 Tax

Offices

DWF's recent history has been dominated by a process of internationalisation. Over the past decade it has developed a presence in key major cities around the world. The firm is headquartered in the Spinningfields district of Manchester and has 33 offices in 15 jurisdictions across Asia, Europe, the Middle East and North America.

References

External links
 Official website 

Companies listed on the London Stock Exchange
Foreign law firms with offices in the United States
Law firms of the United Kingdom
Law firms established in 1977
1977 establishments in England